Age of Pirates 2: City of Abandoned Ships (literally "Corsairs: City of Lost Ships") is a role-playing video game developed by Akella, which was released on May 26, 2009. It is the sequel to Sea Dogs (2000), Pirates of the Caribbean (2003), and Age of Pirates: Caribbean Tales (2006). Like Caribbean Tales, it does not boast either of the two former games' names, due to legal reasons. It was later followed by Sea Dogs: To Each His Own in 2012.

In 2017, the game was digitally released on GOG and Steam as Sea Dogs: City of Abandoned Ships.

Plot
The game is a role playing game, and the plot is rather open ended. At the start, the player may begin alone, or choose one of four navies: England, Spain, France and the Netherlands. The player then embarks on several quests, of which some are mandatory.

The English campaign is based loosely in part on Rafael Sabatini's Captain Blood novel's first twelve chapters, as the main campaign character name, description, the events he is involved in and the characters resemble with the ones described in Sabatini's novel.

Gameplay
The game retains many of the gameplay features from the previous games, such as the ability to trade, fight, battle and board other ships, explore, and sail in real time. The latter feature is not compulsory; a player may choose to sail around using the map. There is a new, faster fight system, and a more complex trading system.

Classes

Player
There are three different characters the player can choose from. Each one has a separate storyline and class.

Weapons
As with the previous games, there are many swords and guns within the game, each with their own attributes.

Main attributes
The player must develop seven main attributes in order to succeed. This is the "new PIRATES role playing system", and the first letter of each attribute comes together to spell PIRATES.

Ships
As with the previous titles, there are many real ship types from the period to choose from. A player may have more than one ship, or in some cases, none at all. The better ships will, of course, cost more money. Some ships can't be bought and must be captured at sea. Some ships are available only after completion of certain quests.

During quests, the player can get the warship Flying Dutchman and the man-of-war Soleil Royal. Queen Anne's Revenge is seen in some ports, but is not controlled by Blackbeard, who was not yet a famous pirate in the game's 17th century setting.

Reception

Upon its release, Age of Pirates 2 was met with "mixed or average" reviews from critics, with an aggregate score of 61% on Metacritic.

References

External links
IGN - Age of Pirates 2: City of Abandoned Ships

2009 video games
Age of Discovery video games
Naval video games
Role-playing video games
Trade simulation games
Video games about pirates
Video games developed in Russia
Video games set in the Caribbean
Video games set in Mexico
Windows games
Windows-only games
Playlogic Entertainment games
Akella games
Single-player video games